The Jordan Sandstone is a geologic formation in Wisconsin. It preserves fossils dating back to the Cambrian period.

See also

 List of fossiliferous stratigraphic units in Wisconsin
 Paleontology in Wisconsin

References
 

Cambrian geology of Wisconsin